Parantennaria is a genus of Australian plants in the tribe Gnaphalieae within the family Asteraceae.

Species
The only known species is Parantennaria uniceps, native to Victoria and New South Wales.

References

External links
Australian Plant Image Index 

Gnaphalieae
Endemic flora of Australia
Monotypic Asteraceae genera